The year 1833 in science and technology involved some significant events, listed below.

Astronomy
 November 12–13 – A spectacular occurrence of the Leonid meteor shower is observed over Alabama.

Biology
 May 3 – The Entomological Society of London is inaugurated.
 Katherine Sophia Kane's The Irish Flora is published anonymously.

Chemistry
 Thomas Graham proposes Graham's Law.

Computer science
 June 5 – Ada Lovelace is introduced to Charles Babbage by Mary Somerville.

Geophysics
 November 25 – A major 8.7 earthquake strikes Sumatra.

Mathematics
 probable date – Paul Gerwien proves the Bolyai–Gerwien theorem formulated by Farkas Bolyai: that any two simple polygons of equal area are equidecomposable.

Paleontology
 Henry Witham publishes The Internal Structure of Fossil Vegetables found in the Carboniferous and Oolitic deposits of Great Britain in Edinburgh.

Physics
 Carl Friedrich Gauss and Wilhelm Eduard Weber develop an electromagnetic telegraph at Göttingen.

Physiology and medicine
 William Beaumont publishes Experiments and Observations on the Gastric Juice and the Physiology of Digestion.
 Charles Bell publishes The Hand: its Mechanism and Vital Endowments as Evincing Design, the fourth Bridgewater Treatise.
 Marshall Hall coins the term "reflex" for a muscular reaction.
 Jean Lobstein proposes use of the term arteriosclerosis.
 Johannes Peter Müller begins publication of his major physiology textbook Handbuch der Physiologie des Menschen.
 Anselme Payen discovers diastase (the first enzyme identified).

Technology
 August 18 – The Canadian ship SS Royal William sets out from Pictou, Nova Scotia on a 25-day passage of the Atlantic Ocean largely under steam to Gravesend, Kent, England.
 Obed Hussey patents a reaper in the United States.
 Cornish engineer Adrian Stephens invents the steam whistle as a warning device at Dowlais Ironworks in Wales.
 Publication by Charles Knight of The Penny Cyclopædia of the Society for the Diffusion of Useful Knowledge begins in London.

Awards
 Copley Medal: Not awarded

Births
 January 19 – Alfred Clebsch (died 1872), German mathematician.
 February 26 – Georges Pouchet (died 1894), French comparative anatomist.
 March 14 – Lucy Hobbs Taylor (died 1910), American dentist.
 March 23 – Karl Friedrich Otto Westphal (died 1890), German psychiatrist.
 March 25 – Fleeming Jenkin (died 1885), English electrical engineer.
 May 5 – Ferdinand von Richthofen (died 1905), German geographer.
 June 29 – Peter Waage (died 1900), Norwegian chemist.
 October 9 – Eugen Langen (died 1895), German mechanical engineer.
 October 17 – Paul Bert (died 1886), French physiologist.
 October 21 – Alfred Nobel (died 1896), Swedish inventor.
 November 27 - Émile Vallin (died 1924), French military physician.
 December 2 – Friedrich Daniel von Recklinghausen (died 1910), German pathologist.

Deaths
 January 10 – Adrien-Marie Legendre (born 1752), mathematician.
 February 6
 Fausto Elhuyar (born 1755), chemist
 Pierre André Latreille (born 1762), zoologist.
 February 14 – Gottlieb Kirchhoff (born 1764), chemist.
 April 22 – Richard Trevithick (born 1771), engineer and inventor.
 May 15 – Bewick Bridge (born 1767), mathematician.
 July 5 – Nicéphore Niépce (born 1765), inventor.
 October 31 – Johann Friedrich Meckel (born 1781), anatomist.

References

 
19th century in science
1830s in science